The main discussion of these abbreviations in the context of drug prescriptions and other medical prescriptions is at List of abbreviations used in medical prescriptions. Some of these abbreviations are best not used, as marked and explained here.

.

Latin abbreviations